Dragan Karanov (born 10 April 1995) is a Serbian football midfielder who plays for German club FC Frittlingen.

References

External links
 
 Dragan Karanov stats at utakmica.rs 
 

1995 births
Living people
Footballers from Novi Sad
Association football midfielders
Serbian footballers
FK Proleter Novi Sad players
OFK Bačka players
FK Vojvodina players
Serbian SuperLiga players